Rhaucus is a genus of harvestmen in the family Cosmetidae. The genus is endemic to the Colombian northern Andes. There are currently six described species in the genus.

Taxonomy 
There were previously more members of Rhaucus, but a 2017 taxonomic revision reduced to genus to a monotypic lineage and synonymized multiple previously described species with the five remaining species. A previously synonymized species, R. papilionaceus, was revalidated in 2018.

Rhaucus is named for an ancient Cretian town, Rhaucus.

Species 
Rhaucus contains six species:

 Rhaucus florezi 
 Rhaucus papilionaceus 
 Rhaucus quinquelineatus 
 Rhaucus robustus 
 Rhaucus serripes 
 Rhaucus vulneratus

References 

Cosmetidae
Harvestman genera
Endemic fauna of Colombia
Arthropods of Colombia
Taxa named by Eugène Simon